The Dream Wanderer is a mobile virtual reality art project by virtual reality artist Flatsitter. This retrofitted transit shuttle / virtual reality art gallery completed a tour across North America in 2017.

The Tour 
While touring across North America, the bus stopped at various locations including:

 Moogfest in Durham, North Carolina;
 Luminato Festival in Toronto, Ontario;
 Pump Project in Austin, Texas;
 Convivio in Oaxaca, México;
 Satellite Art Show in Miami Beach, FL;

Now that the tour has completed, the bus awaits its next journey.

References 

Dream Wanderer